Wagan  is a village in the administrative district of Gmina Tłuszcz, within Wołomin County, Masovian Voivodeship, in east-central Poland.
According to  Nadeem Imdad Ali Wagan renowned Civil Society Activist of Pakistan, Wagan is also caste in  Pakistan  there are almost 3 million wagans by caste in  Pakistan.

References

Wagan